Relax Edition Six is a studio album by Blank & Jones. It was released in 2011.

Track listing
Souvenir 4:28
Only Your Love (with Steve Kilbey) 6:23
After Love (Ambient Mix) 7:30
Love Conquers All (with ABC) (Summer Breeze Mix) 5:28
Nighttime Lovers 6:09
Pura Vida (with Jason Caesar) 3:36
Sundazed 5:16 N
Miracle Man (with Cathy Battistessa) (Beached) 5:36
Simple Life (with Laid Back) 9:41
From N'ney With Love (Extended) 5:30
Cruel Love (with Katja Werker) 4:51
Coming Home 4:43
Comment Te Dire Adieu (with Berry) 2:47
Love Conquers All (with ABC) (Beach Bar Mix) 6:00
Feel Good 6:25
Summergroove 6:02
Futura 4:31
Island Life 5:50
Heartbeat (Poolside Mix) 6:53
Pura Vida (with Jason Caesar) (Beach House Mix) 4:53
Urban Funk 7:29
This Feeling 5:42
Miracle Man (with Cathy Battistessa) (Afterlife Mix) 4:43
Choose Disco 6:34

External links
 Blank & Jones – Relax (Edition Six) on Discogs

Blank & Jones albums
2011 albums